Yuppie Psycho is a 2019 survival horror video game. Developed by Baroque Decay, the game involves Brian Pasternack who is hired at a company and finds himself on task to become a witch hunter, to hunt a witch that has corrupted the company from within. 

The game was released to Steam in 2019, and later received an expanded edition on the Switch, Xbox One and PlayStation 4.

Plot
The game is about Brian Pasternack a new employee at one of the world’s largest corporations, Sintracorp. Pasternack is concerned it might be a scam but agrees to the job. When arriving, he realizes his job is to become a witch hunter, as a witch has existed within the Sintracorp building for years, corrupting the company from the inside. Pasternack then must uncover the mystery of the witch to stop her reign of terror.

Gameplay
There is no combat system, with only some items found in the game that can be used to stop some enemies if they approach the player.

Production
Yuppie Psycho was developed by Baroque Decay. While developed in Spain and France, Yuppie Psycho features a retro pixel art style showcasing an influence of anime and manga styles.

Release
Yuppie Psycho was released on April 15, 2019. A free update titled Yuppie Psycho: Executive Edition was released on the Nintendo Shop and Steam was released on October 29, 2020. The game was initially planned to be released on PlayStation 4 and Xbox One which Baroque Decay stated that their research led to not much interest in those systems, and decided to release it on the Nintendo Switch first to see how it goes. The game was later released for the Xbox One, Xbox Series X on November 3, 2022. It was released on PlayStation 4 on January 11, 2023.

Reception

Yuppie Psycho received a score of 81/100 on review aggregate site Metacritic, indicating "generally favorable reviews". Danielle Riendeau of Vice praised the game's humour stating it was "very funny in its moment to moment" while finding that "not every story beat worked for me, though I found it mostly delightfully campy." and found themselves compelled to see it to the end. Kevin Lynn of Adventure Gamers praised the games satisfying puzzles and survival horror gameplay, and its amusing story, while noting that some of the stealth and survival mechanics were relatively shallow. A review from IGN Japan applauded the game's hybrid of horror and black comedy, but failed to create the tension that the Resident Evil series had, and that it failed to live up to theme's surviving the corporate world towards the end of the game.

References

Sources
 
 
 
 
 
 
 
 

2019 video games
Video games developed in France
Video games developed in Spain
2010s horror video games
Survival horror video games
Indie video games
Nintendo Switch games
PlayStation 4 games
Single-player video games
Windows games
Xbox One games
Retro-style video games
Works set in workplace
Office work in popular culture